Sergey Anatolyevich Sergeyev (born 14 October 1965) is a former Russian professional footballer.

Club career
He made his professional debut in the Soviet First League in 1988 for FC Rotor Volgograd.

References

1965 births
People from Nizhny Tagil
Living people
Soviet footballers
Russian footballers
Association football midfielders
Association football defenders
Russian Premier League players
FC Rotor Volgograd players
FC Tekstilshchik Kamyshin players
FC Energiya Volzhsky players
FC Metallurg Lipetsk players
FC Slavyansk Slavyansk-na-Kubani players
FC Yugra Nizhnevartovsk players
Sportspeople from Sverdlovsk Oblast